Emba may refer to:

Emba, town in Kazakhstan, see Embi
Emba-5, a Soviet former military installation near Embi, now Zhem, Kazakhstan, a town
The Emba River, in Kazakhstan
Emba (village), a village in Cyprus

The acronym EMBA may refer to:
An Executive Master of Business Administration, see MBA